The 1987 Embassy World Indoor Bowls Championship was held at the Coatbridge indoor bowling club, North Lanarkshire, Scotland, from 07-13 February 1987.

Tony Allcock won his second consecutive title beating David Bryant in the final by 5-4 (0-7, 7-6, 7-3, 3-7, 6-7, 7-6, 1-7, 7-5, 7-2).

The 1987 Midland Bank World Indoor Pairs Championship was held at the Bournemouth International Centre from 23–29 March 1987.
David Bryant & Tony Allcock won a second consecutive title defeating Stephen Rees & John Price 5-0 in the final (9-3, 7-2, 6-3, 6-4, 8-4).

Winners

Draw and results

Men's singles

Men's Pairs

References

External links
Official website

World Indoor Bowls Championship